Grand Funk Railroad (often shortened to Grand Funk) is an American rock band formed in Flint, Michigan, in 1969 by Mark Farner (vocals, guitar, keyboards, harmonica), Don Brewer (drums, vocals), and Mel Schacher (bass). The band achieved peak popularity and success during the 1970s with hit songs such as "We're an American Band", "I'm Your Captain (Closer to Home)", "Some Kind of Wonderful", "Walk Like a Man", "The Loco-Motion", "Bad Time" and "Inside Looking Out" (a cover of the Animals). Grand Funk released six platinum and seven gold-certified albums between their recording debut in 1969 and their first disbandment in 1976.

Known for a crowd-pleasing arena rock style, the band toured extensively and played to packed arenas worldwide, and was well-regarded by audiences despite a relative lack of critical praise. The original trio reunited at various times later into the band's career; after Farner's final departure in 1998, Brewer and Schacher have continued touring as Grand Funk Railroad.

History

Formation (1969) 
Grand Funk Railroad was formed as a trio in 1969 by Mark Farner and Don Brewer from Terry Knight and the Pack and Mel Schacher from Question Mark & the Mysterians. Knight soon became the band's manager and also named the band as a play on words for the Grand Trunk Western Railroad, a well-known rail line in Michigan.

Mark Farner talks of the circumstances leading up to the formation of Grand Funk Railroad:

First achieving recognition at the 1969 Atlanta International Pop Festival, the band was signed by Capitol Records, where their manager, Knight, was working as an A&R person. After a raucous, well-received set on the first day of the festival, Grand Funk was asked back to play at the 1970 Atlanta International Pop Festival II the following year. Patterned after hard-rock power trios such as Cream, the band, with Terry Knight's marketing savvy, developed its own popular style. In August 1969, the band released its first album titled On Time, which sold over one million copies and was awarded a gold record in 1970.

In February 1970 a second album, Grand Funk (or The Red Album), was awarded gold status less than two months after its release. Despite critical pans and little airplay, the group's first eight albums (seven studio releases and one live album) were quite successful.

Early 1970s 
The hit single "I'm Your Captain (Closer to Home)", from the album Closer to Home, released in June 1970, was considered stylistically representative of Terry Knight and the Pack's recordings. In the spring of 1970, Knight launched an intensive advertising campaign to promote the album Closer to Home. That album was certified multiplatinum despite a lack of critical approval. The band spent $100,000 on a New York City Times Square billboard to advertise Closer to Home.

By 1971, Grand Funk equaled the Beatles' Shea Stadium attendance record, but sold out the venue in just 72 hours whereas the Beatles concert took a few weeks to sell out. Following Closer to Home, The double disc Live Album was also released later in 1970, and was another gold disc recipient. Survival and E Pluribus Funk were both released in 1971. E Pluribus Funk celebrated the Shea Stadium show with an embossed depiction of the stadium on the album cover's reverse.

By late 1971, the band was concerned with Knight's managerial style and fiscal responsibility. This growing dissatisfaction led Grand Funk Railroad to fire Knight in early 1972. Knight sued for breach of contract, which resulted in a protracted legal battle. At one point, Knight repossessed the band's gear before a gig at Madison Square Garden. In VH1's Behind the Music Grand Funk Railroad episode, Knight stated that the original contract would have run out in about three months, and that the smart decision for the band would have been to just wait out the time. However, at that moment, the band members felt they had no choice but to continue and fight for the rights to their careers and name. The legal battle with Knight lasted two years and ended when the band settled out of court. Knight came out the clear winner with the copyrights and publisher's royalties to every Grand Funk recording made from March 1969 through March 1972, not to mention a large payoff in cash and oil wells. Farner, Brewer and Schacher were given the rights to the name Grand Funk Railroad.

In 1972 Grand Funk Railroad added former Fabulous Pack bandmate Craig Frost on keyboards full-time. Originally, the band had attempted to attract Peter Frampton, late of Humble Pie; however, he was not available due to signing a solo record deal with A&M Records. The addition of Frost, however, was a stylistic shift from Grand Funk's original garage-band based rock and roll roots to a more rhythm and blues/pop rock-oriented style.  With the new lineup, Grand Funk released Phoenix, its sixth album of original music, in September 1972.

To refine Grand Funk's sound, the band then secured veteran musician Todd Rundgren as a producer. Its two most successful albums and two number-one hit singles resulted: the Don Brewer-penned "We're an American Band" (from the number two album We're an American Band, released in July 1973) and "The Loco-Motion" (from their 1974 number five album Shinin' On, written by Carole King and Gerry Goffin and originally recorded by Little Eva). "We're an American Band" became Grand Funk's first number-one hit on Farner's 25th birthday, followed by Brewer's number-19 hit "Walk Like a Man". "The Loco-Motion" in 1974 was Grand Funk's second chart-topping single, followed by Brewer's number-11 hit "Shinin' On". The band continued touring the U.S., Europe and Japan.

Mid-1970s 
In 1974 Grand Funk engaged Jimmy Ienner as producer and reverted to using their full name:  Grand Funk Railroad. The cover of All the Girls in the World Beware!!! (December 1974) depicted the band members' heads superimposed on the bodies of bodybuilders Arnold Schwarzenegger and Franco Columbu. This album spawned the band's last two top-10 hits, "Some Kind of Wonderful" and "Bad Time" in late 1974/early 1975.

Although they were highly successful in the mid-1970s, tensions mounted within the band due to personal issues, burn-out and disputes over musical direction. Despite these issues, Grand Funk forged ahead. Needing two more albums to complete their record deal with Capitol, Grand Funk embarked on a major tour and decided to record a double live album, Caught in the Act (August 1975).

The double album should have fulfilled the contract with Capitol; however, because it contained previously released material, Capitol requested an additional album to complete Grand Funk's contractual obligation. While pressures between the band members still existed, the members agreed to move forward and complete one more album for Capitol to avoid legalities similar to the ones that they endured with Terry Knight in 1972. The band recorded Born to Die (January 1976), but its lower sales (it only managed to reach #47 on the Billboard chart) and lack of hit singles disappointed the group. They began to drift apart and a breakup was rumored.

However, Grand Funk found new life from interest by Frank Zappa in producing the band. Signing with MCA Records, the resulting album Good Singin', Good Playin' (August 1976), though it netted them some of their best critical reviews ever, yielded little success. After this, a totally disillusioned Grand Funk Railroad decided to disband in earnest in late 1976. Farner recalled what happened at that time: "Things were disenfranchised within the band. I don't want to speculate about what was going on in Brewer's life—his first wife died, and that was rough—but one day he walked into the studio and said, 'I've had it. I need to find something to do with my life that's more stable.' He was done. He walked out and slammed the door. It was him, not me. Everybody thinks I broke the band up, but it was him."

First disbanding, 1976–1981; new lineup in the early 1980s 
Following the breakup, Farner began a solo career and signed with Atlantic Records, which resulted in two albums: Mark Farner (1977) and No Frills (1978). Brewer, Schacher and Frost remained intact and formed the band Flint. Flint released one 1978 album on Columbia Records; a second record was finished but never released.

After being approached in 1980 by their former manager Andy Caviliere (who had taken over from Terry Knight in 1972), Grand Funk Railroad reunited in February 1981 without Frost (who was playing with Bob Seger) and with Dennis Bellinger replacing Schacher on bass. Schacher begged off saying he had developed a fear of flying but later confided that he had no longer wanted to be involved with Caviliere.

The new lineup released two albums on Irving Azoff's Full Moon label, distributed by Warner Bros. Records. These releases included Grand Funk Lives (July 1981) and What's Funk? (January 1983). Neither album achieved much in the way of critical acclaim or sales; but the single "Queen Bee" was included in the film Heavy Metal and its soundtrack album.

The band toured in 1981 and 1982 with Rick Baker joining them on the road to play keyboards. But the dismal sales of Grand Funk Lives and the death of manager Caviliere in 1982 caused the group to disband a second time in early 1983, shortly after What's Funk? was released.

Second disbanding, 1983–1996
Farner continued as a solo performer and became a Christian recording artist while Brewer went on to join Frost in Bob Seger's Silver Bullet Band. Farner was promoted by David Fishof in the late 1980s and was a part of Fishof's concept Ringo Starr & His All-Starr Band in 1995. After that, Fishof began sounding out Farner, Brewer and Schacher about reuniting again.

Re-formation, 1996–present 
After some rehearsals in late 1995, Grand Funk Railroad's three original members (joined on tour by keyboardist/guitarist and background vocalist Howard Eddy Jr.) once again reunited in 1996 and played to 500,000 people during a three-year period.

In 1997 the band played three sold-out Bosnian benefit concerts. These shows featured a full symphony orchestra that was conducted by Paul Shaffer (from Late Show with David Letterman). The band released a live two-disc benefit CD called Bosnia recorded in Auburn Hills, Michigan. This live recording also featured Peter Frampton, Alto Reed and Howard Eddy Jr.

In late 1998, Farner left the band after disagreements with Brewer  and returned to his solo career. And after a two-year hiatus, when Brewer and Schacher once again approached Farner about reuniting, he turned them down after they refused to honor his desire to be paid fifty percent, rather than a third of the group's revenue as in the past. He explained his reason in his autobiography, From Grand Funk to Grace: "I do a hell of a lot more work on stage. I wrote the vast majority of the songs. During the 1990s, I committed to two years with Grand Funk. That first year we only did 14 dates. I ended up putting in three years. That was my mistake. I wasn't going to lose money again. At the time, each of us individually owned the Grand Funk trademark. In 1998 Don Brewer suggested we form a corporation to limit our liability as individuals on the road and I agreed. Unfortunately this meant that two thirds of the corporation is the majority". And so in late 2000, Brewer and Schacher voted to go forward without Farner, recruiting lead vocalist Max Carl (formerly of Jack Mack & the Heart Attack and 38 Special), former Kiss lead guitarist Bruce Kulick and keyboardist Tim Cashion (Bob Seger, Robert Palmer) to complete the new lineup.

In 2005 Grand Funk Railroad was voted into the Michigan Rock and Roll Legends Hall of Fame.

In 2018 Brewer and Schacher sued Farner over illegal use of the Grand Funk Trademark. The lawsuit stated that Farner had violated a 2004 agreement, which called for, among other things: that Farner's first and last names appear in capital letters before a reference to Grand Funk or Grand Funk Railroad, with only the first letters of the band capitalized, and first letters of the words, "former," "formerly" and "member" also capitalized.

Also in 2018, bassist Stanley Sheldon (ex-Peter Frampton) filled in for Schacher after Schacher's wife, Dena, died of cancer.

Grand Funk Railroad continues to tour, and kicked off its "The American Band Tour 2019", "Celebrating 50 Years of Funk" tour on January 17, 2019.

Legacy 
David Fricke of Rolling Stone magazine once said, "You cannot talk about rock in the 1970s without talking about Grand Funk Railroad!"
In episode 24 of the seventh season of The Simpsons, titled 'Homerpalooza', Homer Simpson says Grand Funk Railroad is his favorite band of all time.

Band members 

Current members
Don Brewer – drums, lead and backing vocals (1969–1976, 1981–1983, 1996–1998, 2000-present)
Mel Schacher – bass guitar (1969–1976, 1980–1981, 1996–1998, 2000-present)
Max Carl – lead and backing vocals, rhythm guitar (2000–present)
Bruce Kulick – lead guitar, backing vocals (2000–present)
Tim Cashion – keyboards, backing vocals (2000–present)

Former members
Mark Farner – lead and backing vocals, lead and rhythm guitar, keyboards, harmonica (1969–1976, 1981–1983, 1996–1998)
Craig Frost – keyboards, backing vocals (1972–1976; guest 2005–2012)
Lorraine Feather – backing vocals (1974-1975)
Jana Giglio – backing vocals (1974-1975) 
Dennis Bellinger – bass guitar (1981–1983)
Rick Baker – keyboards, synthesizer (1981–1983)
Howard Eddy, Jr. – keyboards, rhythm guitar, backing vocals (1996–1998)
Stanley Sheldon – bass guitar (2018; substitute for Mel Schacher)

Timeline

Discography 

On Time (1969)
Grand Funk (1969)
Closer to Home (1970)
Survival (1971)
E Pluribus Funk (1971)
Phoenix (1972)
We're an American Band (1973)
Shinin' On (1974)
All the Girls in the World Beware!!! (1974)
Born to Die (1976)
Good Singin', Good Playin' (1976)
Grand Funk Lives (1981)
What's Funk? (1983)

References

Further reading

External links 

"The Railroad Rolls On For Grand Funk", interview with Vintage Rock
Interview with Don Brewer on Yuzu Melodies 

Hard rock musical groups from Michigan
Musical groups established in 1968
Capitol Records artists
Musical groups from Flint, Michigan
American blues rock musical groups